Holy Name of Mary College School, located in Mississauga, is Ontario's only independent Catholic school for girls in Grades 5 to 12.

From a 25-acre setting Holy Name of Mary College School offers a liberal arts education and follows a modified semester system as of the 2021–2022 school year. With the exception of certain Open courses, such as Music and Physical Education, all courses are offered exclusively at the Academic level and educate girls to university-entrance standards. Vocal music is a key focus at Holy Name of Mary College School; the school has three award-winning choirs. Holy Name of Mary College School is the sister school of St. Michael's College School, a private, Catholic all-boys school in Toronto.

History
Both Holy Name of Mary College School and Holy Name of Mary Catholic Secondary School trace their origin to the original Holy Name of Mary School founded on 7 September 1964 by the Felician Sisters as a private school for girls.  In 1972, the school entered an agreement with the local school board that students in grades 9 and 10 would be publicly funded. In 1987, Holy Name of Mary became a fully funded Catholic secondary school.

The Felician Sisters and St. Michael's College School co-founded the independent Holy Name of Mary College School. In September 2008, Holy Name of Mary reopened as Holy Name of Mary College School, an independent, Catholic all-girls school.

2008 enrollment figures were very low, however the school community rallied and the school remained open. Father Joe Redican, CSB, and President of St. Michael's College School stated, "there has been incredibly strong community support expressed for the vision of an independent Catholic girls’ school, and specifically for the incredible work the current school is doing in educating the wonderful young women who currently attend."

On Sunday, November 1, 2009, Archbishop Cardinal Thomas Christopher Collins presided at the Blessing and Celebration of Holy Name of College School and students. The Holy Name of Mary College School choir and students from St. Michael's College School provided the music at the mass. Guests included Felician Sisters, Trustees, teachers, alumni, and clergy. The ceremony included a Papal Blessing for the school.

Duke of Edinburgh Award
On Saturday, November 27, 2010, 78 participants from across the GTA and Ontario were presented with their Silver Duke of Edinburgh Award by Marc Kielburger, co-founder of Free the Children, at a ceremony held at HNMCS.
Jill Hermant, Executive Director of The Duke of Edinburgh's Award said, "We are appreciative of all the support HNMCS is providing the Award on this occasion, over and above the stellar programme they run themselves."
As of the 2020–2021 school year, many HNMCS students have pursued the award themselves, with 43 currently partaking in the award.

See also

St. Michael's College School

References

External links
Holy Name of Mary College School

High schools in Mississauga
Middle schools in Mississauga
Elementary schools in Mississauga
Catholic secondary schools in Ontario
Catholic elementary schools in Ontario
Preparatory schools in Ontario
Girls' schools in Canada
Educational institutions established in 1964
1964 establishments in Ontario